Iowa caucuses, 2012 may refer to:

 Iowa Democratic caucuses, 2012
 Iowa Republican caucuses, 2012